The first season of Your Face Sounds Familiar was a singing and impersonation competition for celebrities and was based on the Spanish version of the same name. It aired on March 14, 2015 in ABS-CBN and ended on June 7, 2015. It was hosted by Billy Crawford; Jed Madela, Gary Valenciano, and Sharon Cuneta served as the show's judges.

After 13 weeks, Melai Cantiveros emerged as the winner after garnering 51.93% of the public's votes.

Development
The Philippine version was first announced by ABS-CBN in its trade show for advertisers in Rockwell Tent, Makati. In this show, 8 celebrities will compete in a sing and dance number while impersonating iconic singers. Each week, the "Iconizer" (called the "Randomizer" in other franchises) will assign the artists of whom they will impersonate.

The show replaced the time slot of the second season of The Voice of the Philippines which ended on March 1, 2015.

On March 9, 2015, Sharon Cuneta made a comeback in ABS-CBN; one of her first projects would be to sit as a judge in the show with Madela and Valenciano. In earlier announcements, Toni Gonzaga was reported as one of the judges; however, she was replaced by Cuneta. Every week, the performers would be guided by Teacher Annie Quintos of The Company and Teacher Georcelle of the G-Force for vocals and choreography respectively.

On April 5, 2015, due to Holy Week, the show only had duets, as Black Saturday pre-empts all non-cable shows. However, the eight celebrity contestants were scored individually.

On April 18–19, 2015, Gary Valenciano temporarily left the show to fulfill his commitment of performing in a series of concerts in Papua New Guinea, Spain and Qatar.  He was substituted by Boy Abunda. The same instance happened on May 16–17, 2015, and he was substituted by Vice Ganda.

Prize
Every week the winner will win a cash prize of 100,000 pesos, half will be given to his or her chosen charity. The grand prize is 2 million pesos.

Host, Judges and Mentors

Host
Billy Crawford serves as the host of the local version of Your Face Sounds Familiar.

Judges
The judges, dubbed as "The Jury" in the show:

The Jury
 Sharon Cuneta
 Gary Valenciano
 Jed Madela

Guest judges
 Boy Abunda (Valenciano's replacement judge for Week 6)
 Vice Ganda (Valenciano's replacement judge for Week 10)

Mentors
Annie Quintos of The Company served as the mentor for vocals while Georcelle Dapat of the G-Force served as the mentor for choreography and movement.

Performers
The following are the participating performers in the show's season: They were revealed on March 5, 2015.

Results summary
The table below shows the corresponding total points earned per week: Each performance is ranked in two parts. In the first part, The Jury gives 1, 2, 3, 4, 5, 6, 7 and 8 points to the performers respectively. In the second part, all of the performers give 3 points to another contestant other than him or her.
{| class="wikitable" style="text-align:center; line-height:17px; width:100%;"
|-
! scope="col" width="09%" | Contestant
! scope="col" width="07%" | 
! scope="col" width="07%" | 
! scope="col" width="07%" | 
! scope="col" width="07%" | 
! scope="col" width="07%" | 
! scope="col" width="07%" | 
! scope="col" width="07%" | 
! scope="col" width="07%" | 
! scope="col" width="07%" | 
! scope="col" width="07%" | 
! scope="col" width="07%" | 
! scope="col" width="07%" | 
! scope="col" width="07%" | Points
! scope="col" rowspan="9" style="background:black;" width="01%" |
! scope="col" width="07%" | 
|-
! Melai
| 5th12 points| 5th14 points
| 2nd25 points
| 4th18 points
| 2nd24 points
| style="background:#E8CCD7;" | 8th7 points
| 2nd22 points
| 4th/5th13 points
| style="background:#FDFD96;" | 1st42 points
| style="background:#E8CCD7;" | 7th/8th6 points
| 6th/7th7 points
| 5th/6th12 points
| style="background:#FFE5B4;" | 3rd/4th202 points
| style="background:gold;" | Winner51.93%
|-
! Nyoy
| 4th17 points
| 2nd/3rd21 points
| 4th21 points
| style="background:#E8CCD7;" | 8th4 points
| style="background:#FDFD96;" | 1st27 points
| 3rd23 points
| 4th19 points
| 2nd25 points
| 2nd19 points
| 2nd/3rd23 points
| 3rd25 points
| style="background:#FDFD96;" | 1st33 points
| style="background:#FFE5B4;" | 1st257 points
| style="background:silver;" | Runner-up24.51%
|-
! Jay R
| style="background:#FDFD96;" | 1st36 points
| 2nd/3rd21 points
| 5th14 points
| style="background:#FDFD96;" | 1st33 points
| 3rd18 points
| 6th11 points
| 5th12 points
| 4th/5th13 points
| 3rd18 points
| 2nd/3rd23 points
| 2nd26 points
| 3rd21 points
| style="background:#FFE5B4;" | 2nd246 points
| style="background:#CC9933;" | 3rd Place16.10%
|-
! Edgar Allan
| 2nd23 points
| style="background:#E8CCD7;" | 8th10 points
| 3rd24 points
| 5th13 points
| 5th15 points
| 5th12 points
| 3rd21 points
| 3rd21 points
| 4th17 points
| style="background:#FDFD96;" | 1st27 points
| 6th/7th7 points
| 5th/6th12 points
| style="background:#FFE5B4;" | 3rd/4th202 points
| style="background:#FBCEB1;" | 4th Place7.47%
|-
! Jolina
| 6th9 points
| 6th13 points
| style="background:#FDFD96;" | 1st26 points
| 2nd21 points
| 4th17 points
| style="background:#FDFD96;" | 1st28 points
| style="background:#E8CCD7;" | 8th3 points
| style="background:#E8CCD7;" | 8th10 points
| 5th14 points
| 5th19 points
| 4th21 points
| style="background:#E8CCD7;" | 7th/8th6 points
| 5th187 points
| rowspan="4" style="background:tomato;" | Eliminated
|-
! Karla
| 3rd20 points
| style="background:#FDFD96;" | 1st24 points
| style="background:#E8CCD7;" | 8th3 points
| 7th11 points
| 6th/7th14 points
| 4th15 points
| 7th8 points
| style="background:#FDFD96;" | 1st28 points
| 6th10 points
| 4th21 points
| style="background:#E8CCD7;" | 8th4 points
| 2nd23 points
| 6th 181 points
|-
! Tutti
| style="background:#E8CCD7;" | 8th7 points
| 4th18 points
| 7th9 points
| 3rd20 points
| 6th/7th14 points
| 2nd27 points
| 6th10 points
| 6th/7th11 points
| 7th9 points
| 6th7 points
| style="background:#FDFD96;" | 1st27 points
| 4th19 points
| 7th178 points
|-
! Maxene
| 7th8 points
| 7th11 points
| 6th10 points
| 6th12 points
| style="background:#E8CCD7;" | 8th3 points
| 7th9 points
| style="background:#FDFD96;" | 1st37 points
| 6th/7th11 points
| style="background:#E8CCD7;" | 8th3 points
| style="background:#E8CCD7;" | 7th/8th6 points
| 5th15 points
| style="background:#E8CCD7;" | 7th/8th6 points
| 8th131 points
|-
|}
Legend

Performances

Week 1 (March 14 & 15)
Non-competition performances
 Gary Valenciano as Bruno Mars – "Uptown Funk"
 Jed Madela as Elvis Presley – "Teddy Bear"
 Sharon Cuneta as Adele – "Someone Like You"Episodes Hashtag #YourFaceSoundsFamiliar (Saturday)
 #KaFaceNaKaSoundPa (Sunday)

Week 2 (March 21 & 22)
Non-competition performance
 Billy Crawford as Boy George of Culture Club – "Karma Chameleon"Episodes Hashtag #YFSFWeekendHabit (Saturday and Sunday)

Week 3 (March 28 & 29)Episodes Hashtag #YFSFTransformation (Saturday and Sunday)

Week 4 (April 5)
Due to Holy Week pre-empting regular programming from Thursday to Saturday, the Sunday Episode featured duets instead of individual performances. However the contestants were still scored individually.Episode Hashtag #YFSFDuets (Sunday)

Week 5 (April 11 & 12)Episodes Hashtag #YFSFIcons (Saturday and Sunday)

Week 6 (April 18 & 19)
Guest juror
 Boy Abunda (replacement for Gary Valenciano)Episodes Hashtag #YFSFGoodVibes (Saturday and Sunday)

Week 7 (April 25 & 26)Episodes Hashtag #YFSFShine (Saturday and Sunday)

Week 8 (May 2 & 3)Episodes Hashtag #YFSFLevelUp (Saturday and Sunday)

Week 9 (May 9 & 10)Episodes Hashtag #YFSFFiesta (Saturday)
 #YFSFPerforMOMs (Sunday)

Week 10 (May 16 & 17)
Guest juror
 Vice Ganda (replacement for Gary Valenciano)Episodes Hashtag #YFSFUnkabogable (Saturday and Sunday)

Week 11 (May 23 & 24)Episodes Hashtag #YFSFPasiklaban (Saturday and Sunday)

Week 12 (May 30 & 31)Episode Hashtags #YFSFFinal4 (Saturday and Sunday)

The Grand Showdown: Week 13 (June 6 & 7)
The Grand Showdown was held in Resorts World Manila on June 6 and 7. Unlike in previous weeks where each of the contestants were assigned an icon by the iconizer, the finalists selected the icon that they will impersonate in the finals, in addition, the eliminated contestants impersonated the icons they presumably would've impersonated for the finals.

The winner was decided via public vote. The finals were aired at a later timeslot due to the premiere of the second season of The Voice Kids, which coincindentally premiered on the same week, pre-empting Mga Kwento ni Marc Logan and Wansapanataym.

Non-competition performances
June 6
 Billy Crawford and Sharon Cuneta – "I Want You To Know" by Zedd featuring Selena Gomez
 Jed Madela and Gary Valenciano – "Good Time" by Owl City and Carly Rae Jepsen

June 7
 Enrique Gil and Liza Soberano – "Kiss You" by One Direction
 Jolina Magdangal as Karen Carpenter of The Carpenters – "I Won't Last a Day Without You"
 Maxene Magalona as Nicki Minaj – "Super Bass"
 Tutti Caringal as Bryan Adams – "Heaven"
 Karla Estrada as Gloria Gaynor – "I Will Survive"Episodes Hashtag #YFSFGrandShowdown (Saturday)
 #YFSFGrandWinner (Sunday)Special Awards' Jolina Magdangal - "Mini Me" Award
 Karla Estrada - "Ultimate Diva Award"
 Maxene Magalona - "Yehey" Award
 Tutti Caringal - "Intensity 8" Award

Television ratings
Television ratings for Your Face Sounds Familiar'' on ABS-CBN were gathered from two major sources, namely from AGB Nielsen and Kantar Media. AGB Nielsen's survey ratings were gathered from Mega Manila households, while Kantar Media's survey ratings were gathered from urban and rural households all over the Philippines.

References

External links
 Your Face Sounds Familiar on ABS-CBN
 Your Face Sounds Familiar on Facebook
 Your Face Sounds Familiar on Twitter
 Your Face Sounds Familiar on Instagram

Your Face Sounds Familiar (Philippine TV series)
2015 Philippine television seasons